Ralph Douglas Montagu-Scott, 4th Baron Montagu of Beaulieu (born 13 March 1961) is an English peer and owner of the Beaulieu Estate, home of the National Motor Museum.

Early life and family
Lord Montagu is the son of Edward Montagu-Scott, 3rd Baron Montagu of Beaulieu (1926–2015), and his first wife, Belinda, Lady Montagu, née Crossley (b. 1932). Montagu is the grandson of the 2nd Baron Montagu of Beaulieu (1866–1929) and his second wife, Alice Crake (1895–1996).

His parents divorced in 1974 and later that year, his father married his second wife, Fiona Margaret Herbert, with whom he had another son, Lord Montagu's half-brother, Hon. Jonathan Deane Montagu-Scott (born 11 October 1975).

Career
Lord Montagu is a graphic designer and the Head of Heritage Radio at Radio Times. He is credited as a co-producer of Lord Montagu a documentary about his father, and a series of short films about the stars of the TV comedy series Dad's Army.

He is also the President of the Solent Protection Society, a Governor of Walhampton School, a Director of Beaulieu Enterprises Ltd, and a trustee of the National Motor Museum Trust, the Countryside Education Trust and the Hampshire Archives Trust.

Concerned that local residents were being priced out, Lord Montagu was instrumental in securing social housing in the village of Beaulieu.

Personal life
Lord Montagu is married to Ailsa, Lady Montagu, née Camm. The couple have no children.

The heir presumptive to the barony is Lord Montagu's half-brother, Jonathan, a biochemist who is married to photographer Nathalie Daoust.

References

External links
 Beaulieu website
 

1961 births
Living people
Ralph
People educated at Walhampton School and Hordle House School